The Scribe may refer to:

 The Scribe (film), a 1966 comedy film short
 The Scribe (UCCS), the official newspaper for the University of Colorado at Colorado Springs
"The Scribe" (Ivor Gurney song), a classical song by Ivor Gurney